Natalia Moon (born "Natalie Stephenson"; June 11, 1991) is an Australian, Brisbane born and Darwin raised, actress, singer-songwriter and DJ. She rose to fame for her role in the Filipino sitcom, 'Ismol Family' on GMA Network, (2013–2015) in which she was nominated for 'Outstanding Breakthrough Actress'.

She also starred in the international television drama musical, TKM The Boston, in the lead role as 'Julia', which aired internationally on TFC and Myx TV (2015–2016). She also became the host of North Bound Travel Show produced for ANC News on ABS-CBN in 2016, wherein she left Ismol Family. She has had numerous roles on Shop TV and also appeared as a guest in GMA Network shows such as Aha, Mars, #like, and Eat Bulaga.

Moon also known as (DJ Natalia Moon) travels both domestically and internationally to spin her tracks. She also has her alter ego, Neon Moon, as she DJ's with neon paint in the dark. A recent Asia tour included China, Malaysia, Thailand, Philippines, Singapore, Laos, and Bahrain. She traveled to India in which she competed for the DJ World Champion title, 'Queen of the Mashups', leaving with the title for first place. She plays EDM, house, Latin and hip hop. Moon is not only a DJ, she also includes live singing into her set and she produces her own tracks.

Moon attended St John's College in Darwin and Belridge High in Perth.

Notable appearances

Ismol Family 
Moon starred in the Filipino sitcom Ismol Family, playing the comedic character 'Natalia', a catty maid and extended cousin of the 'Ismol residence' on GMA Network. Her character shared a love team with Mikael Daez. Moon was a part of the show for two years between 2013 and 2015, in which she was nominated for the Golden Screen TV Awards in 2015.

Tkm The Boston (TV show) 
Moon played the lead role 'Julia' in Tkm The Boston also known as 'Kitchen musical 2', sharing the love triangle with 'Gretchen' (Jennifer Blair Bianco) and 'Noah' (Michael Koltes)
Tkm The Boston is a drama musical TV show based around three high school friends incorporating drama, music and food. It aired on Myx TV and TFC internationally.

North Bound Travel Show (TV show) 
Moon hosted North Bound Travel, a travel show based in North Philippines. She traveled the whole of North Luzon featuring the best restaurants, hotels and fun adventures. This aired on ANC News TV in the Philippines and abroad in 2015.

Shop TV 
Moon hosted various products for The Shop TV Network including 'Sonic Toothbrush and 'Zinuo luggage'. Her co host was YouTuber Wil Dasovich. This aired between  2015 and 2016.

Asia's Got Talent 
Moon appeared briefly on the first season of Asia's Got Talent where was unsuccessful in the auditions.

Singing career 
Moon got noticed from a cover song called "Pusong Bato", in which landed her a guesting on GMA News TV. This was the beginning of her singing career and the beginning of her career in Philippines show biz. She started learning more of the Filipino language and landed a role on Ismol Family.

DJ/producing career 
Moon became a DJ after attending Bounce music school in BGC at the start of 2015, learning mixing songs and also music production in Abelton. She DJ's for fiestas and festivals local and abroad, mixing Hip hop, house, EDM and also corporate shows. Moon is a unique DJ as she sings live hip hop and edm songs during the set.

Awards and achievements 
 Nominated for New Female Recording Artist of the year 9TH PMPC AWARDS Philippines 2018 
 Nomination for Outstanding Breakthrough Actress Ismol Family 
 Uno Magazine Cover
 BYS cosmetics
 Philippines Magazine 
 Hansel Crackers Commercial (lead)

References 

 Feature Philippines Magazine 
 UNO MAGAZINE COVER GIRL NATALIA MOON 
 GOLDEN SCREEN AWARDS PRESS
 PRESS LOVE LIFE NATALIA MOON AND ALJUR ABRENICA
 NOMINATION AWARD PMPC
 GOLDEN SCREEN AWADS PRESS FEATURE
 GMA NEWS 'ISMOL FAMILY' NATALIA MOON 
 ISMOL FAMILY TV SHOW STAR NATALIA MOON FEATURE 
 THE BOSTON TV SHOW INTERVIEW NATALIA MOON 
 BOSTON FEATURE TV SHOW 
 PHIL STAR FEATURE NATALIA MOON TV HOST 
 how to become a dj
 NATALIA MOON DJING VELOCI BRAND
 INDIA WORLD DJ COMP 
 NATALIA MOON INTERVIEW QRN NETWORK 
 EDMDROID FEATURE NATALIA MOON
 MIO RADIO DJ FEATURE WITH NATALIA MOON 
 ALBUM NOMINATION PMPC NATALIA MOON 
 GMA FEATURE NATALIA MOON, WHO IS SHE DATING ?
 GMA RECORDS NATALIA MOON 
 FEATURE GMA NATALIA MOON (GIVE ME FIVE) 
 NATALIA MOON COOKING ON MARS GMA NEWS
 NATALIA MOON INTERVIEW (Balitang Amianan)
 ROAD TRIP TV SHOW WITH NATALIA MOON 
 PHILIPPINES MAGAZINE FEATURE NATALIA MOON 

1991 births
Living people
Australian DJs
21st-century Australian actresses
GMA Network personalities